The following is a list of amphibians of Northeast India. The presence of amphibian species in each of the seven Northeastern states is indicated by green checkmarks. Species endemic to Northeast India are labeled as endemic. The list is based on Sen (2004), with additional records from Nagaland included from Ao, et al. (2003).

Due to its humid climate, Meghalaya has the most amphibian species diversity.

List

Names in local languages
Below are some frog names in the Miju language of Arunachal Pradesh.

Hoplobatrachus tigerinus: hāŋgrān
Hylarana taipehensis: phòlōlōnt
Megophrys parva: tāʔòŋ
Duttaphrynus melanostictus: càŋ khàŋ ə̄pay
Bufo stomaticus: hāŋŋūm

References

Ao, J.M., Bordoloi, S. and Ohler, A. 2003. Amphibian fauna of Nagaland with nineteen new records from the State including five new records for India. ZOO’s Print Journal 18(6): 1117-1125.
Sen, Nibedita (2004). Further notes on statewise distribution of the amphibian fauna of North East India. Rec. Zool. Surv. India: 102 (Part 3-4): 105-112, 2004.

See also
List of amphibians of India
List of amphibians of Bhutan
List of amphibians of Sikkim

Frogs of India
Amphibians, Northeast India
India